The EJU consists of 51 national Judo federations/associations, and is itself recognised by the IJF as one of five continental unions. The organisation of the administration of Judo is based on a pyramid system of regulations, with the IJF the world governing body, the EJU the European governing body, and national Judo associations the governing bodies at domestic level.

The first meeting was held on July 26, 1948, in London to form the European Judo Union (EJU). Representatives from Great Britain, Austria, and the Netherlands took part. The meeting was adjourned until the following Wednesday. On July 28 finally, Great Britain put forward the motion: "That the European Judo Union be now formed on the basis of the Constitution as approved, and that all other European countries be circulated with a copy of it and be invited to join." This was seconded by Holland and approved unanimously. France, who was allowed to express opinions but not to vote.

The object of the proposed Union was the standardisation of judo rules and procedures and the establishment of an international body for arbitration. Inclusion of judo in the Olympic Games was first mentioned in this meeting. Young French publisher Henry D. Plee suggested that he print a translation of the Kodokan's monthly magazine in English and French; the EJU agreed to make it an official organ of the EJU.

After the 2022 Russian invasion of Ukraine, in February 2022 Russian Sergey Soloveychik resigned as European Judo Union  President, a position he had held since 2007, and thereafter the Russian Judo Federation and the Belarusian Judo Federation suspended their participation in all EJU international events, and the EJU cancelled two events that had been scheduled to take place in Russia. In addition, the EJU withdrew Russian President Vladimir Putin's title of Honorary President of EJU.

Presidents

Awards

Main events

Members

  Albanian Judo Federation
  Andorra Judo Federation
  Armenian Judo Federation
  Austrian Judo Federation
  Azerbaijan Judo Federation
  Belarusian Judo Federation
  Belgium Judo Federation
  Bosnia & Herzegovina Judo Federation
  British Judo Association
  Bulgarian Judo Federation
  Croatian Judo Federation
  Cyprus Judo Federation
  Czech Judo Federation
  Danish Judo Federation
  Dutch Judo Federation
  Estonian Judo Association
  Faroe Islands Judo Federation
  Finnish Judo Association
  French Judo Federation
  Macedonian Judo Federation
  Georgian Judo Federation
  German Judo Federation
  Hellenic Judo Federation
  Hungarian Judo Association
  Iceland Judo Federation
  Irish Judo Association
  Israel Judo Association
  Italian Judo Federation
  Kosovo Judo Federation
  Latvia Judo Federation
  Liechtenstein Judo Federation
  Lithuanian Judo Federation
  Luxembourg Judo Federation
  Malta Judo Federation
  Moldova Judo Federation
  Monaco Judo Federation
  Montenegro Judo Federation
  Norwegian Judo Federation
  Polish Judo Association
  Portugal Judo Federation
  Romanian Judo Federation
  Russian Judo Federation
  San Marino Judo Federation
  Serbia Judo Federation
  Slovak Judo Federation
  Slovenian Judo Federation
  Spanish Judo Federation
  Swedish Judo Federation
  Swiss Judo Federation
  Turkish Judo Federation
  Ukrainian Judo Federation

References

External links
EJU Official website
International Judo Federation

International Judo Federation
International organisations based in Vienna
Judo in Europe
Sports governing bodies in Europe